Seema Nanda is an American government official currently serving as the United States solicitor of labor in the Biden administration.

Early life and education 
Seema Nanda was born in Chicago after her parents immigrated to the United States in the early 1970s. Her parents are from Punjab but grew up in Uttar Pradesh; both came to the US and worked as dentists. Nanda grew up in West Simsbury, Connecticut and attended the Westminster School.

Nanda received an A.B. from Brown University in 1992 and a J.D. from Boston College Law School in 1995.

Career 
From 2007 to 2010, Nanda worked as a supervisor attorney at the National Labor Relations Board. She served as a senior trial attorney from 2010 to 2011 and acting deputy special counsel from 2011 to 2013 at the United States Department of Justice Civil Rights Division.

Nanda joined the Department of Labor in  2013, serving as chief of staff and deputy chief of staff to Secretary of Labor Tom Perez.

In July 2018, Nanda became CEO of the Democratic National Committee. She served in the position until May 2020.

Solicitor of Labor nomination
Nanda was nominated to become the United States Solicitor of Labor by President Joe Biden on March 26, 2021. The Senate HELP Committee held hearings on her nomination on April 29, 2021. The committee favorably reported her nomination to the Senate floor on May 12, 2021. The entire Senate confirmed Nanda on  July 14, 2021, by a vote of 53-46.

Tenure
On November 6, 2021, it was reported that Nanda defended President Biden's attempt to enforce a COVID-19 vaccine mandate against US workers at businesses with over 100 employees after a federal judge blocked it on the grounds that the plaintiffs' challenge against the mandate raised “grave statutory and constitutional issues.” Nanda asserted that her Department of Labor was “confident in its legal authority” to issue the rule; that Federal law “explicitly gives OSHA the authority to act quickly in an emergency where the agency finds that workers are subjected to a grave danger and a new standard is necessary to protect them"; and that [her US Department of Labor is] "fully prepared to defend this standard in court.”

References 

Living people
American labor lawyers
Brown University alumni
Boston College Law School alumni
Obama administration personnel
Biden administration personnel
United States Department of Labor officials
Year of birth missing (living people)